The Wuqiu Lighthouse is a lighthouse in Daqiu Village, Wuqiu Township (Ockseu), Kinmen County (Quemoy), Fujian Province (Fukien), Republic of China (Taiwan).

History

The lighthouse was constructed by the Netherlands in 1874 with engineer David Marr Henderson and deputy engineer John Ropinald to serve as navigation aid for ships sailing between Fuzhou and Xiamen. The lighthouse lost its top structure during World War II and was repaired afterwards to become a lower black lighthouse in 1947. However, the lighthouse became inactive in 1951 as part of military strategy due to the tension with People's Liberation Army. In 1960-1975, works were made to improve the lighthouse, such as concreting the wall, increasing its height, adding house inside the wall and creating a connecting tunnel. In 2001, the lighthouse was officially closed after it was placed under the jurisdiction of the Republic of China Armed Forces. On 23 July 2017, the Maritime and Port Bureau signed an agreement with the armed forces to take over the lighthouse. Currently, the Wuqiu Township government is trying to register the lighthouse to be a national historic site.

Architecture
The lighthouse tower is a cylindrical tower with lantern and gallery. It is located on the highest point of Daqiu Island.

Technical details
This manned-lighthouse focal plane is 87 meters, radiating a white flash every 5 seconds.

Lightkeepers
 1885 - C.M. Peterson (in charge) and J. Chapman

See also

 List of tourist attractions in Taiwan
 List of lighthouses in Taiwan
 Queenscliff High Light, black lighthouse in Australia

References

External links
 Maritime and Port Bureau MOTC 
 Picture of Wuqiu Lighthouse
 烏坵嶼燈塔復燈20170723 ('Relit Wuqiu Lighthouse, July 23, 2017')

1874 establishments in China
Buildings and structures in Kinmen County
Lighthouses in Taiwan
Lighthouses completed in 1874
National monuments of Taiwan
Wuqiu Township